Shar may refer to:

Shar Music, a company that specializes in stringed instruments and also sells sheet music.
Shar (tribe), a tribe in upper Sindh
Shar, Kazakhstan
Shar (country subdivision)
Shar means "east" in Tibetan.
BAE Sea Harrier, a British VTOL aircraft is nicknamed shar
shar, the Unix shar program stands for "SHell ARchive"
Shar (Forgotten Realms), a fictional goddess of the Forgotten Realms campaign setting for Dungeons & Dragons
Kostin Shar, an alternative name of the Kostin Strait
Matochkin Shar, an alternative name of the Matochkin Strait
Shar Jackson  (born 1976), American actress
Yugorsky Shar, an alternative name of the Yugorsky Strait
India's Sriharikota Range satellite launch facility before being renamed Satish Dhawan Space Centre in 2002
Šar Mountains
"Evil" in Arabic, used to refer to the Italian colonization of Libya